E. nigricans may refer to:
 Enchelycore nigricans, the mottled conger moray or mulatto conger, a moray eel species found in the Atlantic and Pacific Oceans
 Endochironomus nigricans, a non-biting midge species in the genus Endochironomus found in Europe
 Epidendrum nigricans, Schltr., 1913, an orchid species in the genus Epidendrum
 Euxesta nigricans, a picture-winged fly species
 Euxoa nigricans, the garden dart, a moth species found throughout Europe
 Evarcha nigricans, Dalmas, 1920, a jumping spider species in the genus Evarcha found in Tunisia

See also
 Nigricans (disambiguation)